Alexander Drennan (16 December 1899 – 9 November 1971) was a New Zealand labourer, trade unionist, communist and watersider. He was born in Greenock, Renfrewshire, Scotland on 16 December 1899.

References

1899 births
1971 deaths
New Zealand trade unionists
New Zealand communists
Scottish emigrants to New Zealand